Oaklimeter Creek is a stream in the U.S. state of Mississippi.

Oaklimeter is a name derived from the Choctaw language purported to mean "young people" or possibly "young town". Variant names are "Oakljmeter Creek", "Okannatie Creek", and "Oklolimeter Creek".

References

Rivers of Mississippi
Rivers of Benton County, Mississippi
Rivers of Marshall County, Mississippi
Mississippi placenames of Native American origin